Bontempo is a surname. Notable people with the surname include:

Leonel Bontempo (born 1992), Argentine footballer
Salvatore A. Bontempo (1909–1989), American politician

Surnames of Italian origin